The Tempest was an event on the 2012 Vintage Yachting Games program at Lake Como,  Italy. Six out of the nine scheduled race were entered. 30 sailors, on 15 boats, from 4 nations entered.

Venue overview

Race area and Course
Of the three Campo's (Race Area's) available for the 2012 Vintage Yachting Games at Lake Como Campo Charlie was used for the Tempest event. In general this Campo is situated in front of the city of Bellano.

For the 2012 edition of the Vintage Yachting Games three different courses were available. The Tempest could use course 1 or 2.

Wind conditions 
The Northern part of Lake Como was reportedly a thermic wind venue. In this time of year the normal situation is that at about 13:00 the Swiss mountains are heated up and a Southern wind hits the racing areas with about 10 to 14 knots. As result of this no races were scheduled in the morning. Unfortunately during the event the temperature in Switzerland were low. Also was the thermal South breeze battling with the gradient wind from the North. As result the actual wind did not came above the 8 knots during the races and was instable at times.

Campo Bravo has normally a tendency to have a slightly higher wind speed than the two other Campo's this due to the fact that it is more Northern than Charlie so that the Southern thermal breeze is strengthened and that the fact that the lake narrows in  front of Dervio.

Races

Summary 
In the Tempest six out of the planned nine races were completed.

In the Tempest class (Olympic between 1972 – 1976) the battle went between team of Cornelia Christen, Ruedi Christen from Switzerland and the team of president of the German Sailing Federation: Rolf Bähr, Christian Spranger. In the last two races the Swiss team showed their light air competencies and won both races. The Italian host team of Alessandro Castelli, Paolo Brambilla came in fourth after Klaus Wende, Max Reichert who took the bronze. The Tempest, known by the older sailors as a class for the heavy weightssailors, give a wonderful display of mixed team sailing.

Results 

 dnc = did not compete
 dns = did not start
 dnf = did not finish
 dsq = disqualified
 ocs = on course side
 ret = retired after finish
 Crossed out results did not count for the total result.

Daily standings

Victors

Notes

References 
 

Tempest